Schauburg is a theatre in Munich, Bavaria, Germany.

From 1967 to 1972 the internationally renowned nightclub Blow Up resided in the building, which was Germany's first large-scale disco.

References

Theatres in Munich